Mike Favor (born June 27, 1966) is an American football former player. He played college football for the North Dakota State University. He was elected to the College Football Hall of Fame in 2011.

References

1966 births
Living people
American football centers
North Dakota State Bison football players
College Football Hall of Fame inductees